The 2017 Supercopa de España de Baloncesto was the 14th edition of the tournament since it is organized by the ACB and the 18th overall. It will be also called Supercopa Endesa for sponsorship reasons. It was played in the Gran Canaria Arena in Las Palmas on September. Herbalife Gran Canaria was the defending champion.

Participant teams and draw
On February 13, 2017, the ACB confirmed Las Palmas to host the tournament. The semifinals were drawn on 6 July 2017, without any restriction.

Semifinals

Valencia Basket vs. Unicaja

Herbalife Gran Canaria vs. Real Madrid

Final

References

External links
 Liga ACB website

Supercopa de España de Baloncesto
2017–18 in Spanish basketball cups